Peter Ala Adjetey (11 August 1931 – 15 July 2008) was the Speaker of the Parliament of Ghana from 2001 to 2005.

Early life
Peter Ala Adjetey was born on 11 August 1931 at Accra, the capital of Ghana. He obtained his basic education at St. Paul's School at La, a suburb of Accra, and at Accra Bishop Boys' School. His secondary education was at Accra Academy. He proceeded to the University College of the Gold Coast (now the University of Ghana), where he obtained the University of London intermediate bachelor's degree in 1954. He then proceeded to the United Kingdom, where he graduated with a bachelor's degree in law from University of Nottingham in 1958. Adjetey was called to the Bar at Middle Temple in London in 1959. He returned to Ghana in the same year where he was also called to the bar.

Career
From 1959 to 1962, Adjetey worked as a Law Officer with the Attorney General's department. He was a part-time lecturer at the Institute of Adult Education, University of Ghana between 1960 and 1962. He was also a part-time lecturer at the Ghana School of Law between 1964 and 1968. He also served on numerous boards at various times including membership of the Judicial Council of Ghana from 1984 to 1989. He was the President of the Ghana Bar Association  between 1985 and 1989. He was appointed the President of the African Bar Association in 2000.

Politics
Adjetey was the Member of Parliament for Kpeshie in the Third Republic of Ghana. He was also the leader of the United National Convention Parliamentary group during the same period. In 1995, he became Chairman of the New Patriotic Party (NPP), a position he held until 1998.

Awards
Adjetey was awarded the national honour of the Order of the Volta in 2008. In that same year, he received an honorary doctorate from the University of Ghana.

Death
Adjetey died on 15 July 2008 after a short illness.

References

External links
Ghana Home Page

1931 births
2008 deaths
People from Accra
Ghanaian MPs 1979–1981
20th-century Ghanaian lawyers
Speakers of the Parliament of Ghana
Alumni of University of London Worldwide
Alumni of the University of London
University of Ghana alumni
Alumni of the University of Nottingham
Members of the Middle Temple
United National Convention politicians
New Patriotic Party politicians
Alumni of the Accra Academy
Ga-Adangbe people
Recipients of the Order of the Volta
Ghanaian Anglicans